2015–16 Belarusian Cup was the twenty fifth season of the Belarusian annual cup competition. Contrary to the league season, it is conducted in a fall-spring rhythm. The first were played on 23 May 2015. Winners of the Cup qualified for the second qualifying round of the 2016–17 UEFA Europa League.

Participating clubs 
The following teams took part in the competition:

First round
In this round 5 amateur clubs and 9 randomly chosen Second League clubs were drawn into 7 fixtures. The matches were played on 23 and 24 May 2015.

Second round
In this round 7 winners of the First Round were joined by 11 remaining Second League clubs and 14 First League clubs to play in 16 fixtures. Two leaders of First League as of the moment of the draw (Isloch Minsk Raion and Smorgon) were given a bye to the Round of 32. The matches were played on 10 June 2015.

Round of 32
In this round 16 winners of the Second Round were joined by 2 remaining First League clubs and 14 Premier League clubs to play in 16 two-legged fixtures. The matches were played on 16–19 July and 1–2 August 2015.

|}

First leg

Second leg

Round of 16
In this round 16 winners of the previous were paired into 8 two-legged fixtures. The draw was conducted on 4 August 2015.

|}

First leg

Second leg

Quarter-finals
The first legs were played on 19 and 20 March 2016 and the second legs were played on 6 April 2016.

|}

First leg

Second leg

Semifinals
The first legs were played on 20 April 2016 and the second legs will be played on 4 May 2016.

|}

First leg

Second leg

Final
The final match was played on 21 May 2016 at OSK Brestsky in Brest.

References

External links
 Football.by

2015–16 European domestic association football cups
Cup
Cup
2015-16